Dehradun Legislative Assembly constituency was a part of the Uttar Pradesh Legislative Assembly from 1951 to 2000. It became a part of the Interim Uttarakhand Assembly from 2000 to 2002.

Members of Legislative Assembly

Election results

2007 results

2002 results

1996 results

1993 results

1991 results

1989 results

1985 results
Hira Singh Bisht won election against harbans Kapoor

1977 results

1969 results

1967 results

1962 results

1957 results

See also
 Dehradun Cantonment (Uttarakhand Assembly constituency)

References

Politics of Dehradun
Former assembly constituencies of Uttarakhand